The Wiley-Ringland House is a historic home located at Somerset, Montgomery County, Maryland, United States. It is named for its original owner / builder Harvey Washington Wiley and longtime owner / resident, Arthur Cuming Ringland. The house is a -story Queen Anne-style frame building built about 1893. A fire in 1978 virtually destroyed the house, but it was restored between 2001 and 2002 by new owners.

The Wiley-Ringland House was listed on the National Register of Historic Places in 2000.

References

External links
, including photo in 2000, at Maryland Historical Trust website

Houses on the National Register of Historic Places in Maryland
Houses completed in 1893
Houses in Montgomery County, Maryland
Queen Anne architecture in Maryland
National Register of Historic Places in Montgomery County, Maryland